The Euronext 100 Index is the blue chip index of the pan-European exchange, Euronext NV. 

It comprises the largest and most liquid stocks traded on Euronext. Each stock must trade more than 20 percent of its issued shares over the course of the rolling one year analysis period. The index is reviewed quarterly through a size and liquidity analysis of the investment universe. As of December 21, 2002, the stocks in the Euronext100 Index represent 80% (euro 1,177 billion) of the total market capitalization of Euronext’s investment universe (euro 1,477 billion). 
Each stock in the index is given a sector classification.

See also

 STOXX Europe 50
 S&P Europe 350

External links 
Components from euronext.com 

Pan-European stock market indices
Euronext indices